Donald or Don Roberts may refer to:

 Don Roberts (ice hockey) (1933–2016), American college men's ice hockey coach
 Don Roberts (politician), former Canadian politician
 Don Roberts (art director) (1934–1999), American television art director and production designer
 Donald F. Roberts (born 1939), Stanford communications professor emeritus
 Donald John Roberts (born 1945), Stanford economics professor and associate dean
 Donald Roberts (politician) (born 1948), member of the Montana Legislature
 Donald Roberts, judge of the Supreme Court of the Northern Territory
 Donald A. Roberts, mayor of Waterloo, Ontario
 Donald Van Norman Roberts (1928–2016), civil, geotechnical and environmental engineer
 Donald W. Roberts (born 1933), American insect pathologist